The Mallee Football Netball League (MFNL) was an Australian rules football and netball competition finishing in 2015 with just five clubs based in the Mallee region of northwestern Victoria, Australia. The league featured three grades in the Australian rules football competition, being First-Grade, Reserve-Grade and Under 16s. It is not to be confused with the identically named Mallee Football League (South Australia).

History
The Mallee Football League was formed in 1997 from the merger of the Northern Mallee Football League and Southern Mallee Football League. The Northern Mallee Football League had been reduced to four clubs after Ouyen Rovers and Tempy-Gorya-Patchewollock merged to form Ouyen United.
The Mallee Football League was disbanded at the end of the 2015 season due to insufficient member clubs.

Clubs

Clubs

(*) Beulah merged with Hopetoun to form Southern Mallee Giants
(**) Brim merged with Warracknabeal to form Warrack Eagles
(***) Manangatang merged with Tooleybuc to form Tooleybuc-Manangatang
(****) Walpeup-Underbool merged with Ouyen United and decided to keep the Ouyen United name but wear Walpeup-Underbool's Kangaroos colours before entering the Sunraysia league in 2016.

Premierships
1997   Jeparit-Rainbow
1998   Ouyen United
1999   Berri-Culgoa
2000   Beulah
2001   Walpeup-Underbool
2002   Managatang
2003   Beulah
2004   Beulah
2005   Beulah
2006   Ouyen United   
2007   Walpeup-Underbool
2008   Walpeup-Underbool
2009   Sea Lake-Nandaly Tigers
2010   Beulah
2011   Ouyen United
2012   Walpeup-Underbool
2013   Woomelang-Lascelles
2014   Sea Lake-Nandaly Tigers
2015   Sea Lake-Nandaly Tigers

Leading Goal Kickers

2008 Ladder

2009 Ladder

2010 Ladder

2011 Ladder

2012 Ladder

2013 Ladder

External links 
League website
 Full Points Footy -Mallee Football League

Mallee (Victoria)
Defunct Australian rules football competitions in Victoria (Australia)
Sports leagues established in 1997
1997 establishments in Australia
2015 disestablishments in Australia
Sports leagues disestablished in 2015